The Moncton Hawks were a professional ice hockey team based in Moncton, New Brunswick. They played in the American Hockey League between 1987 and 1994, operating as a minor league affiliate of the Winnipeg Jets. Home games were played at the Moncton Coliseum. Previously, Moncton was home to the New Brunswick Hawks, Moncton Alpines, and Moncton Golden Flames.

History
The name "Moncton Hawks" was the name of several previous senior league teams that played in the Maritime Senior Hockey League, Maritime Major Hockey League, New Brunswick Senior Hockey League, Atlantic Coast Senior League and Nova Scotia Senior Hockey League. These amateur teams operated from 1931 to 1979. The 1933 and 1934 teams won the Allan Cup senior men's Canadian championship. From 1978 to 1987, several American Hockey League teams operated in Moncton: the New Brunswick Hawks, Moncton Alpines and Moncton Golden Flames.

In 1987, the Winnipeg Jets signed an agreement with the local ownership group in Moncton to provide players for the Moncton AHL franchise after the Calgary Flames and Boston Bruins folded the Golden Flames, purchasing the long-dormant Boston Braves franchise from the Bruins for the purpose. The team operated for seven seasons, never finishing higher than third place in the division. The Hawks made the playoffs four of their first six years in the league, reaching the second round of the playoffs three of those years. The seventh season would be their most successful, and featured a new logo for 1993–94. The Hawks finished the regular season third place in the Atlantic Division, but eliminated two higher-seeded division foes before losing to the Portland Pirates in the Calder Cup finals.

Seeking to cut costs in a time when the AHL was beginning to withdraw from Atlantic Canada, the Jets folded the Hawks after the 1994 season, and joined with the Hartford Whalers in a dual affiliation with the expansion Springfield Falcons the following year.

The team featured several players who went on to have successful NHL careers including Kris Draper, Darryl Shannon, Stu Barnes and Dan Bylsma, who went on to win the Stanley Cup as head coach of the Pittsburgh Penguins.

In 1995, the Moncton Alpines of the QMJHL filled the void in the market that was left after the Hawks folded. That team later became the Moncton Wildcats.

Coaches
Multiple seasons in parentheses.
 1987–89 - Rick Bowness (2)
 1989–92 - Dave Farrish (3)
 1992–93 - Rob Laird
 1993–94 - Charlie Bourgeois

Training staff
1989–93 - Rob Snitzer, Wayne Flemming, Jamie Druet, Andrew Trites, Derek Robichaud 
1993–94 - Gord Hart, Wayne Flemming, David Lorette, Rob Cormier

Season-by-season results

Regular season

Playoffs

See also
List of ice hockey teams in New Brunswick

References
 

 
Hawks
New Brunswick Sports Hall of Fame inductees
Ice hockey clubs established in 1987
Ice hockey clubs disestablished in 1994
1987 establishments in New Brunswick
1994 disestablishments in New Brunswick
Winnipeg Jets minor league affiliates